The Mysterious Knight (French: Le Chevalier mystère) is an 1899 French short silent trick film directed by Georges Méliès.

Themes
The Mysterious Knight is a trick film in which motifs from the European Medieval period are used satirically as a setting for cinematic special effects. This was one of two Medieval-themed genres in the silent cinema, both of which were developed and codified by Méliès himself; the other was a less overtly whimsical, more plot-oriented genre of narrative film telling medieval stories, such as Méliès's 1900 epic Joan of Arc. Both types of Medieval film invented by Méliès were extensively influential, quickly spreading to the United States and other filmmaking countries. The medieval trick film genre was a particularly decisive influence, leading eventually to the development of animated medieval films as well as to medieval epics that use computer-generated imagery for spectacular purposes.

The film is also one of many Méliès works featuring living body parts becoming detached from the rest of the body. Other examples include The Man with the Rubber Head, The Infernal Cake Walk, and The Melomaniac.

Production
The special effect of the talking head in a vase was created using multiple exposure, with the film stock was rewound in the camera and reexposed. Black cloth was used to mask the set when the head was filmed. Méliès performed a similar trick, with three duplications of his own head, in his film The Four Troublesome Heads.

Release and survival
The film was released by Méliès's Star Film Company and is numbered 226–227 in its catalogues. It was presumed lost until a print was identified in the vaults of the George Eastman House. In 1989, a restored print of the film was premiered at the Pordenone Silent Film Festival.

References

External links

 The Mysterious Knight on YouTube

1899 films
French silent short films
French black-and-white films
Films directed by Georges Méliès
Trick films
1890s rediscovered films
Rediscovered French films
1899 short films
1890s French films